Luo Honghao (born 31 January 2000) is a Chinese former professional snooker player.

Career

Amateur 
In July 2017, he reached the final of 2017 IBSF World Under-21 Snooker Championship where he lost the final 7–6 to Fan Zhengyi.

Later in March 2018, he won the 2018 WSF Championship following a 6–0 demolition of Adam Stefanów in the final in Malta. This victory earned him a two-year World Snooker Tour card for the 2018–19 and 2019–2020 seasons.

Luo reached the third round of the 2018 China Open aged just 18 years old. He received an invitation to compete in 2018 World Snooker Championship qualifying round as an amateur, but he could not obtain the visa on-time.

Professional 
In the 2018/19 season, Luo reached the quarter final of the 2018 English Open, before being defeated 5-3 by Ronnie O'Sullivan. At the final event of the season, Luo defeated Marco Fu 10–7, Robbie Williams 10-8 and Tom Ford 10–8 to reach the main stage of the 2019 World Snooker Championship held at The Crucible in Sheffield. However, in his first-round match against Shaun Murphy, he became only the second player to suffer a whitewash at the World Snooker Championship at The Crucible, losing 10-0 and setting a record for fewest points in a match at the Crucible with 89.

Personal life 
Luo is a highly accomplished pianist but chose snooker as a career aged 11.

Performance and rankings timeline

Career finals

Amateur finals: 2 (1 title)

References

External links
Luo Honghao at worldsnooker.com

Chinese snooker players
Living people
2000 births
People from Nanchang
Sportspeople from Jiangxi
21st-century Chinese people